A Penning mixture, named after Frans Michel Penning, is a mixture of gases used in electric lighting or displaying fixtures. Although the popular phrase for the most common of these is a neon lamp, it is more efficient to have the glass tube filled not with pure neon, but with a Penning mixture, which is defined as a mixture of one inert gas with a minute amount of another gas, one that has lower ionization voltage than the main constituent (or constituents).

Explanation 

The other gas, called a quench gas, has to have lower ionization potential than the first excited state of the noble gas. The energy of the excited, but neutral, noble gas atoms then can ionize the quench gas particles by energy transfer via collisions; known as the Penning effect.

A very common Penning mixture of about 98–99.5% of neon with 0.5–2% of argon is used in some neon lamps, especially those rated for 120 volts. The mixture is easier to ionize than either neon or argon alone, and lowers the striking voltage at which the tube becomes conductive and starts producing light. The optimal level of argon is about 0.25%, but some of it gets adsorbed onto the borosilicate glass used for the tubes, so higher concentrations are used to take the losses into account; higher argon content is used in higher-power tubes, as hotter glass adsorbs more argon. The argon changes the color of the "neon light", making it slightly more yellowish. The gas mixtures used in nixie tubes often also included a small amount of mercury vapor, which glowed blue.

A Penning mixture of neon and argon is also used as a starter gas in sodium vapor lamps, where it is responsible for the faint reddish glow before the sodium emission begins.

The Penning mixture used in plasma displays is usually helium or neon with small percentage of xenon, at several hundred torr.

Penning mixtures with the formulas of argon–xenon, neon–argon, argon–acetylene, and xenon–TMA are used as filler gases in gaseous ionization detectors.

Other kinds of Penning mixture include helium–xenon.

See also
 Geiger–Müller tube
 Neon lamp
 Nixie tube
 Paschen's law
Penning effect

References

Further reading 

Neon lighting
Noble gases
Plasma physics
Industrial gases